Carlo Borer (born March 23, 1961 in Solothurn) is a Swiss artist and designer.

Works 
Carlo Borer is deliberately autodidact as an artist. He has been working freelance since 1981, beginning with figurative paintings, drawings, and three-dimensional works made of polyester and electrical light. Since 1991, he has been building objects out of stainless steel or aluminum. And in 1999, he started using 3D computer graphics to design, develop, and construct sculptures, installations, furniture and utilitarian objects, such as espresso machines, ventilators, and mailboxes. A laser is used to cut the forms out of the sheet metal, which are then rounded off and welded. Borer refers to works that have come about like this as Transformers, Loops, and Clouds. Though Borer takes his inspirations for his No Readymades and his Spaceships from pieces he has found, nevertheless, he creates the works as complex forms in virtual reality by means of CAD systems that have been further developed especially for this.

Carlo Borer lives in Wanzwil, and maintains his studio in Zuchwil.

Selected exhibitions 
 1990 : Kunstmuseum Solothurn, Solothurn
 1997 : BHG Gallery, Los Angeles – Sinking Cities
 2004 : Stadt Solothurn - The Big Loop
 2009 : 4.th Swiss Triennial Festival of Sculpture, Bad RagARTz in Bad Ragaz and Vaduz
 2010 : art station, Zurich – 2structures
 2010 : Stiftung SkulptUrschweiz, Ennetbürgen-Luzern
 2010 : BeGe Galerien, Ulm
 2010 : Nord Art in Büdelsdorf
 2011 : Nord Art in Büdelsdorf
 2011 : Kulturforum Würth Chur, Chur – Thinking Shape

Commissions visible in public 
 2002 : Object No. 333, Saint-Blaise NE,
 2007 : Object No. 397, Ennetbüren-Luzern 
 2009 : Object No. 401, Hilti Foundation, Schaan
 2011 : Object No. 370, Kulturforum Würth Chur

Selected literature 
 Catalogue Werkjahrbeiträge des Kantons Solothurn (1989) - Kantonales Kuratorium für Kulturförderung, Solothurn
 KVS Cultura, Ittigen, Issue 1 (1991)
 Peculiar Geometries, (Sculpture Vol. 27 No. 10, 2008): article by Peter Lodermeyer 
 Kunst Vol. 4 (2011)

References

External links 
 Carlo Borer’s official website
 Carlo Borer’s own website

1961 births
Living people
20th-century Swiss sculptors
20th-century Swiss male artists
21st-century Swiss sculptors
Swiss designers
20th-century Swiss painters
Swiss male painters
21st-century Swiss painters
21st-century Swiss male artists